Francis Cadell may refer to:

Francis Cadell (explorer) (1822–1879), Scottish explorer and riverboat pioneer in Australia 
Francis Cadell (artist) (1883–1937), Scottish artist